Torrance Albert Russell, Jr. (January 23, 1916 – February 1, 1997) was an American football offensive lineman in the National Football League for the Washington Redskins.  He played college football at Auburn University and was drafted in the eighth round of the 1939 NFL Draft. His interment was located in Birmingham's Elmwood Cemetery.

External links

1916 births
1997 deaths
American football tackles
Auburn Tigers football players
Players of American football from Birmingham, Alabama
Washington Redskins players
Burials at Elmwood Cemetery (Birmingham, Alabama)